Cervical artery may refer to:

 Ascending cervical artery
 Deep cervical artery
 Transverse cervical artery